Susan Kathleen Doughty (née Powell; born 13 April 1948) is a politician in the United Kingdom. She was Liberal Democrat Member of Parliament for Guildford from 2001 until 2005.

Early life
Doughty was born on 13 April 1948. She was brought up in York where she went to Mill Mount Grammar School for Girls on Mill Mount, who's site became All Saints RC School after the abolition of the Grammar School scheme in 1985. 

She gained a CertED at Northumberland College and worked as a primary school teacher for one year. Doughty subsequently entered the field of management services and worked in a variety of organisations spanning sectors such as utilities, the 'Big 4', law practices and financial services providers. 

In 1982–9, she worked as a freelance IT consultant. From 1989 to 1998, she was a Project Manager at Thames Water.

Parliamentary career
Doughty entered Parliament in the 2001 election, becoming the first non-Conservative MP returned for Guildford since 1906 and the constituency's first ever female MP. In Parliament, she served as the Liberal Democrat Environment Spokesman from 2001 to 2003, following on from her successful campaign opposing the construction of a large incinerator in Guildford. She was part of the front bench team from 2003 to 2005 and served on the Environmental Audit Select Committee throughout her time in Parliament. She was co-Chair of the All Party Parliamentary Waste Group (now the All Party Parliamentary Resource Group) and Secretary of the APPG for Renewable Energy.

She left in the 2005 general election, when she lost narrowly to the Conservative candidate Anne Milton. Doughty is a Quaker and upon her departure in 2005, left Parliament without any Quaker MPs for the first time in 150 years.

Doughty was re-selected as prospective parliamentary candidate for Guildford for the 2010 election, however she was again defeated by Milton. Between 2010 and 2016, she was a member of the Federal Executive Committee of the Liberal Democrats.

Miscellaneous
 Doughty joined the Liberal Party, the predecessors to the Liberal Democrats, in 1979 while living near Newbury.
 Membership of the Environmental Audit Select committee (2001–2005)
 Selected as PPC to fight the Guildford Constituency (1998)
 Hansard lists the alternative names: Sue Powell (1948–2005)  Sue Orchard-Doughty (1948–2005).

Personal life
Doughty currently lives in Shalford, a suburb of Guildford. She was married to David Orchard (d. 2015) and she has two sons.

References

External links 
 Guildford Liberal Democrats Constituency Website
 Guardian Unlimited Politics - Ask Aristotle: Sue Doughty
 TheyWorkForYou.com - Sue Doughty
 
 The Public Whip - Sue Doughty Voting Record
 Hansard Record

Liberal Democrats (UK) MPs for English constituencies
Female members of the Parliament of the United Kingdom for English constituencies
UK MPs 2001–2005
English Quakers
1948 births
Living people
Members of the Parliament of the United Kingdom for Guildford
Politicians from York
21st-century British women politicians
Politics of Guildford
21st-century English women
21st-century English people